The following is a list of films produced in the Kannada film industry in India in 1987, presented in alphabetical order.

See also
Kannada films of 1986
Kannada films of 1988

References

1987
Lists of 1987 films by country or language
Films, Kannada